Giovanni Dalla Bona (born 21 September 1951) is an Italian racing cyclist. He rode in the 1975 Tour de France.

References

External links
 

1951 births
Living people
Italian male cyclists
Place of birth missing (living people)
Cyclists from the Province of Verona